The State Archives of the Soviet Union have been inherited by the post-Soviet states. They include:

National and special archives 

 National Archives of Armenia
 National Archive Department of Azerbaijan
 National Archives of Belarus
 National Archives of Estonia
 National Archives of Georgia
 Lithuanian Special Archives
 State Archive of the Russian Federation
 State Archive Service of Ukraine

Lists of archives  
 List of archives in Armenia
 List of archives in Azerbaijan
 List of archives in Estonia
 History of archives of Lithuania
 List of archives in Russia
 List of archives in Ukraine